Dancin' My Blues Away is the fourth studio album by American bluesman Gary B. B. Coleman released in 1990 by Ichiban Records label.

Track listing

Personnel
Gary B. B. Coleman – guitar, producer, vocals
Ernie Baker – trumpet
Bryan Cole – drums
John Cole – bass
Ted Dortch – saxophone
Louise Freeman – backing vocals 
Steve McRay – keyboards

References

1990 albums
Gary B. B. Coleman albums
Ichiban Records albums